Tachmurad Shamakovich Agamuradov  (born 18 August 1952) is a  Turkmen football manager. He was last head coach of FC Qizilqum Zarafshon.

Managing career

He started managing career at sport internat of Turkmenistan Sport Committee in 1982, until 1990. After that he trained Nebitchi Balkanabat from 1990 to 1993. He was coach of Turkmenistan in football tournament of 1994 Asian Games in Hiroshima.

In 2001-2005 he was head coach of Pakhtakor Tashkent and 2004 was named as Coach of the Year.

On September 28, 2011, after Ravshan Khaydarov was sacked and Murod Ismailov  replaced him as temporary caretaker of the club, Agamuradov became assistant coach to Ismailov, returning to the club.

In June 2012 Agamuradov was appointed as head coach of FK Buxoro, replacing Jamshid Saidov. On 10 November 2013 he left his position in FK Buxoro. In 2014, he was named as trainer of Dinamo Samarqand. On 2 July 2015 he announced that he is resigning his post at Dinamo. After leaving Dinamo, on 10 July 2015 he started working as consultant coach at FK Buxoro.

Managerial honours

Club
Nebitchi Balkanabat
Ýokary Liga runner-up: 1992
Ýokary Liga 3rd: 1993
Turkmenistan Cup runner-up: 1992

Nisa Aşgabat
Ýokary Liga runner-up: 1995, 1995

Köpetdag Aşgabat
Ýokary Liga (2): 1998, 2000
Turkmenistan Cup (2): 1996/97, 2000
CIS Cup semifinal: 1997, 1998, 2001
 Asian Cup Winners' Cup semifinal: 1997-98

Pakhtakor
Uzbek League (5): 2002,  2002, 2003, 2004, 2005
Uzbek Cup (3): 2001/02, 2002/03 и 2004
 AFC Champions League semifinal: 2002–03, 2004
CIS Cup semifinal: 2003

National team
Turkmenistan
Asian Games quarter-final: 1994, 1998

Individual

 Uzbekistan Football Coach of the Year: 2004

Personal life 
Täçmyrat Agamyradow's son Ahmet is also Turkmen coach.

References

External links

Living people
1952 births
Sportspeople from Ashgabat
Turkmenistan football managers
Soviet football managers
FC Nisa Aşgabat managers
Turkmenistan national football team managers
FK Köpetdag Aşgabat managers
Pakhtakor Tashkent FK managers
FC Kairat managers
FK Dinamo Samarqand managers
PFC Lokomotiv Tashkent managers
PFK Nurafshon managers
FC Shurtan Guzar managers